Albin Wolf (28 October 1920 – 2 April 1944) was a German Luftwaffe military aviator during World War II, a fighter ace credited with 144 enemy aircraft shot down. All of his victories were claimed over the Eastern Front.

Born in Neuhaus, Wolf grew up in the Weimar Republic and Nazi Germany. Following graduation from school, he joined the Luftwaffe in 1940. In May 1942, Wolf was posted to Jagdgeschwader 54 (JG 54—54th Fighter Wing) and claimed his first aerial victory on 6 August 1942. Following his 117th aerial victory, he was awarded the Knight's Cross of the Iron Cross on 22 November 1943. Promoted to an officer's rank, he was appointed squadron leader of 6. Staffel (6th squadron) of JG 54 and claimed his 144th and last aerial victory on 2 April 1944. That day, he was shot down. He was posthumously bestowed with the Knight's Cross of the Iron Cross with Oak Leaves.

Early life and career
Wolf was born on 28 October 1920 in Neuhaus, present-day part of Selbitz in the district Hof, at the time in the district of Naila, Bavaria. He was the son of a wage labourer. After graduation from school, Wolf joined the Luftwaffe in 1940. Following flight training, he was posted to the 2. Staffel (2nd squadron) of Jagdgeschwader 1 (JG 1—1st Fighter Wing) based in Jever in the fall of 1941. Holding the rank of Unteroffizier (non-commissioned officer), he flew with this unit in Defense of the Reich until May 1942.

World War II
World War II in Europe had begun on Friday 1 September 1939 when German forces invaded Poland. On 22 June 1941, Germany had launched Operation Barbarossa, the invasion of the Soviet Union, which initiated the Eastern Front. In May 1942, Wolf was transferred to the 6. Staffel (6th squadron) of Jagdgeschwader 54 (JG 54—54th Fighter Wing), operating on the northern sector of the Eastern Front. At the time, he was made a wingman of Hans Beißwenger. II. Gruppe (2nd group) of JG 54, to which 6. Staffel was subordinated, was one of the Luftwaffe units fighting in support of Army Group Centre, engaging in the Kholm Pocket and Demyansk Pocket.

Wolf claimed his first aerial victory over an Ilyushin Il-2 ground-attack aircraft, shot down on 6 August 1942 in the vicinity of Zubtsov during the Battles of Rzhev. Following his fourth claim, filed on 30 September, he was awarded Iron Cross 2nd Class the next day. On 23 March 1943, his number of aerial victories had increased to 18 following combat in the vicinity of Leningrad. This resulted in the presentation of the Honor Goblet of the Luftwaffe on 30 April 1943. On 12 July, during the Battle of Kursk, Soviet forces launched its counteroffensive named Operation Kutuzov. The next day, General Paul Deichmann dispatched the equivalent of eight Jagdgruppen to defend against the Soviet 15th Air Army. That morning, Wolf claimed a Soviet fighter aircraft shot down. He achieved his aerial victories 37–40 on 2 August 1943. By 4 September 1943, he had accumulated 78 victories. In November 1943, Wolf was credited with his 100th aerial victory. He was the 59th Luftwaffe pilot to achieve the century mark. Wolf received the Knight's Cross of the Iron Cross for 117 victories on 22 November 1943.

On 24 December 1943, following the German retreat during the Battle of the Dnieper (26 August – 23 December 1943), Soviet forces initiated the Zhitomir–Berdichev Offensive as part of the Dnieper–Carpathian Offensive. The Soviet advance threatened the German airfield at Bila Tserkva and II. Gruppe of JG 54 was ordered to relocate to Tarnopol on 27 December. The transfer was attempted under adverse weather conditions. On 29 December, 24 aircraft took off but only one made it directly to Tarnopol. Many aircraft were lost that day, among them Focke-Wulf Fw 190 A-6 (Werknummer 531087—factory number) flown by Wolf who crash landed the aircraft and was severely wounded. On 11 March 1944, he was appointed Staffelkapitän (squadron leader) of 6. Staffel.

Wolf's 135th aerial victory claimed on 23 March 1944 was also JG 54's 7000th of the war. Wolf was killed in action south-east of Pskov on 2 April 1944. His Fw 190 A-6 (Werknummer 551142—factory number) took a direct hit from an anti-aircraft shell. He was posthumously promoted to Oberleutnant (first lieutenant) and awarded the Knight's Cross of the Iron Cross with Oak Leaves on 27 April 1944. He was the 464th member of the German armed forces to be so honored. Stockert indicated that the Oak Leaves presentation date 27 April 1944 may be incorrect. Based on a list published by the Oberkommando der Luftwaffe (High Command of the Air Force), the Oak Leaves were awarded on 25 April 1944.

Summary of career

Aerial victory claims
According to US historian David T. Zabecki, Wolf was credited with 144 aerial victories. Mathews and Foreman, authors of Luftwaffe Aces — Biographies and Victory Claims, researched the German Federal Archives and found records for 142 aerial victory claims, all of which claimed on the Eastern Front.

Victory claims were logged to a map-reference (PQ = Planquadrat), for example "PQ 18234". These sectors were then subdivided into 36 smaller units to give a location area 3 × 4 km in size.

Awards
 Iron Cross (1939)
 2nd Class (1 October 1942)
 1st Class (22 January 1943)
 Honour Goblet of the Luftwaffe on 30 April 1943 as Unteroffizier and pilot
 German Cross in Gold on 17 October 1943 as Oberfeldwebel in the 6./Jagdgeschwader 54
 Knight's Cross of the Iron Cross with Oak Leaves
 Knight's Cross on 22 November 1943 as Oberfeldwebel and pilot in the 6./Jagdgeschwader 54
 464th Oak Leaves on 27 April 1944 (posthumously) as Leutnant and pilot in the 6./Jagdgeschwader 54

Notes

References

Citations

Bibliography

 
 
 
 
 
 
 
 
 
 
 
 
 
 
 
 
 
 
 

1920 births
1944 deaths
Luftwaffe pilots
German World War II flying aces
Luftwaffe personnel killed in World War II
Recipients of the Gold German Cross
Recipients of the Knight's Cross of the Iron Cross with Oak Leaves
People from Hof (district)
Military personnel from Bavaria
Aviators killed by being shot down